"Come On Over" is a song written by Mike Kerr and Ben Thatcher of British rock duo Royal Blood. The song was originally recorded by the duo for the band's debut single, "Out of the Black", where it appeared as the B-side. The track later appeared as the third track on the band's debut extended play Out of the Black, and as the second track on the band's eponymous debut studio album, Royal Blood. The track also appeared on the band's third single, released by Black Mammoth Records and Warner Bros. Records on 21 April 2014. "Come On Over" also appears on the soundtrack for WWE 2K15 and Guitar Hero Live.

Track listing

Personnel
Partly adapted from Out of the Black liner notes.

Royal Bloodv
 Mike Kerr – lead vocals, bass guitar
 Ben Thatcher – drumsTechnical personnel'''
 Tom Dalgety – producer, recording
 John Davis – mastering
 Alan Moulder – mixing (track 1)

Charts

Certifications

Release history

References

External links
 
 Royal Blood official website

2014 singles
Warner Records singles
2014 songs
Royal Blood (band) songs
Song recordings produced by Tom Dalgety